United Nations Security Council Resolution 1668, adopted unanimously on April 10, 2006, after recalling Resolution 1581 (2005), the Council extended the term of Judge Joaquín Canivell at the International Criminal Tribunal for the former Yugoslavia (ICTY) beyond his term of office to allow him to complete a case.

The Secretary-General Kofi Annan had requested the Council to extend Canivell's term so he could complete the Krajišnik case, notwithstanding the fact that his service at the ICTY had exceeded three years.

See also
 List of United Nations Security Council Resolutions 1601 to 1700 (2005–2006)
 Yugoslav Wars

References

External links
 
Text of the Resolution at undocs.org

 1668
2006 in Serbia and Montenegro
 1668
April 2006 events